Dreams with Sharp Teeth is a 2008 biographical documentary film about writer Harlan Ellison. It is composed of original and archive footage of Ellison and talking head segments from colleagues and fans including Robin Williams, Peter David, and Neil Gaiman.

History
In 1981, then-24-year-old producer Erik Nelson began shooting footage of Ellison while the author was at work on his typewriter. The footage was meant for a PBS segment set to air in March of that year. Ellison allowed Nelson to repeatedly film and interview him over subsequent years, stating that he thought Nelson to be "a fan working on a student project", and has stated that he never suspected that the film would amount to a serious production on such a professional level.

The result of those sessions, and subsequent sessions spanning decades from the original, have been culled and edited, with additions from contemporaries of Ellison into what has become a documentary following a rough arc of Ellison's life and activities.

The film's name was taken from the title of a three-volume omnibus of Ellison's works that was published in 1991.

Dreams with Sharp Teeth received its first public screening Thursday, April 19, 2007, at the Writers Guild Theatre in Los Angeles. In September 2007, the film was screened at Ellison's last public appearance in his hometown of Cleveland for the Midwestern debut of the documentary at Cleveland Public Library.

The DVD version was released on May 26, 2009. Additional materials on the DVD include a short feature on the film's debut screening, a conversation over pizza between Ellison and Gaiman, and readings of extracts from a number of short stories.

Reception

References

External links
 
 Troublemaker: Erik Nelson's Dreams with Sharp Teeth Review at indieWIRE.com
 Dreams with sharp teeth Review at filmcritic.com

2008 films
American documentary films
Documentary films about writers
Harlan Ellison
2008 documentary films
2000s English-language films
2000s American films